Nacaduba sinhala, the Pale  Ceylon line blue, or Ceylon six-lineblue, is a species of Lycaenidae butterfly. It is endemic to Western Ghats complex (Western Ghats and Sri Lanka).

Description
Wingspan is about 18–28 mm. Clearly distinguished due to whitish discal area and terminating three large whitish post discal spots on upper surface of the fore wing in male. In male apex round, wings transparent. There is a silvery tint with a trace of eyespot on tornus in hindwing. Female has bluish dorsum and bands irrorated with silvery white with dark blue. Larval host plants are Embelia robusta and Ardisia humilis. A new subspecies, N. s. ramaswamii, was discovered in Pothigai in 2021.

References

Nacaduba
Butterflies of Sri Lanka
Butterflies described in 1924